Mouloudia Club d'Alger, referred to as MC Alger or MCA for short, is an Algerian volleyball team that was founded on 1947, as a division of the of MC Alger. They play their home games in Hacène Harcha Arena, which has a capacity of 8,000 people.

History
From 2008 to 2020, the team was known as GS Pétroliers as it was part of the multi-sports club with that name.

The team's name changed back to MC Alger in 2020.

Previous names
Mouloudia Chaâbia d'Alger (1947-1977)
Mouloudia Pétroliers d'Alger (1977-1988)
Mouloudia Club d'Alger (1988-2008)
Groupement Sportif des Pétroliers (2008–2020present)

Honors

National achievements
Algerian Championship :
 Winners (10 titles) : (1989, 1991, 1995, 2003, 2004, 2005, 2006, 2007, 2008, 2013)

Algerian Cup :
 Winners (11 titles) : (1984, 1988, 1989, 1990, 1991, 1995, 1996, 2003, 2005, 2007, 2010)

International achievements
African Club Championship :
 Winners (2 titles) : (1988, 2007)
 Runners up (4x vice champions) : (1989, 1990, 1991, 1997)

Head coaches

As of 2014

Notable players
 Tarek Nehai

References

External links
  Site officiel de Sonatrach (sections sport)

Groupement Sportif des Pétroliers
Algerian volleyball clubs
Volleyball clubs established in 1947
Sport in Algiers
1947 establishments in Algeria